The Federal Correctional Institution, Oakdale (FCI Oakdale) is a low-security United States federal prison for male inmates in Louisiana. It is part of the Oakdale Federal Correctional Complex (FCC) and operated by the Federal Bureau of Prisons, a division of the United States Department of Justice.

The complex consists of two facilities:

 Federal Correctional Institution, Oakdale (FCI Oakdale I): a low-security facility.
 Federal Correctional Institution, Oakdale (FCI Oakdale II): a low-security facility.

FCI Oakdale is located in central Louisiana, thirty-five miles south of Alexandria and fifty-eight miles north of Lake Charles.

Notable incidents
June 22, 2009, 29-year-old inmate Alberto Gallegos-Velazquez violently assaulted another inmate in the recreational yard at FCI Oakdale. The victim inmate, who the Bureau of Prisons did not identify, suffered a fractured skull and an intracranial hemorrhage which resulted in long-term disabilities including seizures, loss of speech, and an inability to move his right extremities. Gallegos-Velazquez subsequently pleaded guilty to assault resulting in serious bodily injury and was sentenced an additional fifty-one months in prison and ordered to pay more than $158,000 in restitution.

On April 6, 2020, the ACLU sued the Bureau of Prisons and FCI-Oakdale Warden Rodney Myers on behalf of incarcerated people. According to the ACLU, "The legal team seeks the release of people who are incarcerated and at high risk for serious injury or death in the event of COVID-19 infection due to age and/or underlying medical conditions." Days later, incarcerated people refused orders when staff attempted to move people who had been potentially exposed to the virus into housing units with no known cases. Authorities used "paintball guns to fire paintballs full of pepper spray at prisoners, as well as teargas, according to Vice News." As of February 23, 2021 at least eight incarcerated people at FCI-Oakdale have died from COVID-19.

Notable Inmates

See also

List of U.S. federal prisons
Federal Bureau of Prisons
Incarceration in the United States

References

External links
Official website

Prisons in Louisiana
Buildings and structures in Allen Parish, Louisiana
Oakdale